Pitch Perfect 2: Original Motion Picture Soundtrack is the soundtrack album to the 2015 musical comedy film Pitch Perfect 2. It was released on May 12, 2015 by Universal Music. Mark Mothersbaugh was hired to compose the music for the film on December 3, 2014. The album was preceded by Flashlight as the lead single, which was initially offered with the album's pre-order, but was made available eventually on April 23, 2015. The special edition was later released on August 8, 2015.

Singles
"Flashlight" by Jessie J was made available on April 23, 2015, as the lead single of the soundtrack album. It debuted on the Billboard Hot 100 chart on 28 May 2015, at number 68. It eventually peaked at number 61. The second single, "Crazy Youngsters", performed by cast member Ester Dean, was released on May 10, 2015, with its music video to further promote the film's release.

Commercial performance
The soundtrack debuted at number one on the Billboard 200, earning 107,000 album-equivalent units (92,000 copies of traditional sales) during its first week. The soundtrack also debuted at number two on the UK Soundtrack Albums Chart, and peaked at number one the next week.

Track listing

Charts

Weekly charts

Year-end charts

Certifications

References

2015 soundtrack albums